These are the international rankings of Hungary.

Demographics

 Population ranked 93  (2017 est.)
 Life expectancy ranked 57  (2015)

Economy

(2019)
 Index of Economic Freedom: ranked 54 . (2016)
 Ease of Doing Business Index: ranked 41 . (2017)
 Inequality adjusted Human Development Index ranked 28  (2015)
 Trade Freedom Index ranked 20 . (2016)
 Fiscal Freedom Index ranked 96 . (2016)
 Monetary Freedom Index ranked 2 . (2016)   
 Social Progress Index ranked 37 . (2017)
 Fragile States Index ranked 135 . (2017)
International Monetary Fund: GDP in purchasing power parity ranked 59  (2017 est.)
International Monetary Fund: GDP per capita in purchasing power parity ranked 45  (2016)
The World Factbook: Labour force participation ranked 87  (2013 est.)
The World Factbook: exports ranked 35  (2015 est.)
The World Factbook: imports ranked 34  (2016 est.)

International rankings

References

Hungary